A skin tag, or acrochordon (pl. acrochorda), is a small benign tumor that forms primarily in areas where the skin forms creases (or rubs together), such as the neck, armpit and groin. They may also occur on the face, usually on the eyelids. Though tags up to half an inch (12.7 mm) long have been seen, they are typically the size of a grain of rice. The surface of an acrochordon may be smooth or irregular in appearance and is often raised from the surface of the skin on a fleshy stalk called a peduncle. Microscopically, an acrochordon consists of a fibrovascular core, sometimes also with fat cells, covered by an unremarkable epidermis. However, tags may become irritated by shaving, clothing, jewellery or eczema.

Etiology

Skin tags are thought to occur from skin rubbing against skin, since they are so often found in skin creases and folds. Studies have shown existence of low-risk human papillomaviruses 6 and 11 in skin tags, hinting at a possible role in their pathogenesis, although a 2012 study found no association between skin tags and either low or high risk HPV. Acrochorda have been reported to have a prevalence of 46% in the general population. A causal genetic component is thought to exist. They are also more common in women than in men. Acrochorda were once thought to be associated with colorectal polyps, but studies have shown no such connection exists. Rarely, they can be associated with Birt–Hogg–Dubé syndrome, acromegaly, or polycystic ovary syndrome.

Elevated blood sugar and insulin is linked to an increased incidence of skin tags through an unknown mechanism.

Treatment
Removal, if desired or warranted, can be done by a dermatologist, general practitioner or similarly trained professional who may use cauterization, cryosurgery, excision, laser, or surgical ligation to remove the acrochorda. Varied home remedies are also available, but most are unproven and some (e.g. tea tree oil) may cause allergic skin reactions.

See also 
 Molluscum contagiosum (a viral disease which is similar in appearance and grows in similar areas)
 List of cutaneous neoplasms associated with systemic syndromes
Papilloma
Cutaneous horn

References

External links 

Dermal and subcutaneous growths